Mark Joseph Suzor (born November 5, 1956) is a Canadian former professional ice hockey player.

Playing career
Born in Windsor, Ontario, Suzor spent his junior days with the Kingston Canadians of the Ontario Hockey Association (OHA) from 1973–76, scoring 119 points (36 goals and 83 assists) in 186 games, and also earned 16 points (3 goals, 13 assists) in 15 playoff games. He was drafted by the Philadelphia Flyers of the National Hockey League (NHL) with the 17th overall pick in the 1976 NHL Entry Draft, and was also drafted by the San Diego Mariners of the World Hockey Association in the 1976 WHA Amateur Draft as the 25th overall pick. Suzor signed with Philadelphia and continued to work towards the NHL.

He spent most of the 1976–77 season with the Springfield Indians of the American Hockey League (AHL), scoring 49 points (24 goals, 25 assist) in 74 games, and he spent some time with the Flyers, earning an assist in 4 games. After the season, he was dealt to the Colorado Rockies for Barry Dean, and spent the 1977–78 season with the club, scoring 19 points (4 goals, 15 assists) in 60 games. Suzor was then traded again, as the Rockies sent him to the Boston Bruins for Clayton Pachal.

Suzor bounced around four teams in the 1978–79 season, playing with the Saginaw Gears of the International Hockey League (IHL), scoring 24 points (12 goals, 12 assists) in 29 games, the Grand Rapids Owls of the IHL, with 2 assists in two games, the Muskegon Mohawks of the IHL, scoring 6 points (1 goal, 5 assists) in 16 games, and finally with the Rochester Americans of the AHL, earning 10 points (4 goals, 6 assists) in 24 games. He played the 1979–80 season with the Owls, having the most productive season of his pro career, with 53 points (20 goals, 33 assists) in 58 games, and played 7 games with the Binghamton Dusters of the AHL, earning an assist.

Mark finished his pro career in 1980–81, playing in 8 games with the Toledo Goaldiggers, getting 3 points (1 goal, 2 assists) before retiring from his playing career.

Career statistics

Regular season and playoffs

External links
 

1956 births
Binghamton Dusters players
Canadian ice hockey defencemen
Colorado Rockies (NHL) players
Grand Rapids Owls players
Ice hockey people from Ontario
Kingston Canadians players
Living people
Muskegon Mohawks players
National Hockey League first-round draft picks
Philadelphia Flyers draft picks
Philadelphia Flyers players
Rochester Americans players
San Diego Mariners draft picks
Saginaw Gears players
Sportspeople from Windsor, Ontario
Springfield Indians players
Toledo Goaldiggers players